Tom Brown (born 31 March 1990) is a Scotland and Scotland 7's international rugby union player.

Rugby Union career

Amateur career

He played rugby union for his school, Edinburgh Academy; and went on a rugby-playing tour to South Africa with the school team.

Professional career

He played for Edinburgh District at age-grade.

Brown made his Edinburgh Rugby debut against Leinster at Murrayfield in September 2010, and impressed sufficiently throughout the rest of the campaign, he offered a one-year contract for the 2010–11 season at Edinburgh Rugby.

After regular and solid displays for Edinburgh, Brown was rewarded with a two-year contract extension in April 2014.

In a covid-19 hit season 2020-21 he was with the Glasgow Warriors squad. He did not manage a first team competitive game for the Warriors - but played for their 'A' side at Full-back against Edinburgh 'A' on 4 February 2021. At the end of the season, Brown was thanked in a 'leavers video' by the club for his support to the squad over the season.

International career

Brown was capped by Scotland U20 at the IRB Junior World Championship in the 2009 IRB Junior World Championship in Japan and the 2010 IRB Junior World Championship in Argentina.

Brown made the cut for Scotland's 2012 summer tour the Australia and Pacific Islands, during which he made his debut for Scotland off the bench in the historic victory against Australia.

He has been capped by Scotland 7's in the World Rugby Sevens Series.

References

External links 

 http://www.scotlandrugbyteam.org/content/view/2465/210/

1990 births
Living people
Rugby union players from Edinburgh
Scottish rugby union players
People educated at Edinburgh Academy
Alumni of the University of Edinburgh
Edinburgh Rugby players
Scotland Club XV international rugby union players
Scotland international rugby union players
Glasgow Warriors players
Scotland international rugby sevens players